Joseph Chez (January 24, 1869 – November 23, 1961) was an American politician who served as the Attorney General of Utah from 1933 to 1941.

He died on November 23, 1961, in Medford, Oregon at age 92.

References

1869 births
1961 deaths
Utah Attorneys General
Utah Democrats
Politicians from Medford, Oregon